Warp & Weft is the ninth studio album by American singer-songwriter Laura Veirs. Released on August 19, 2013 in the United States, and August 24, 2013 in Europe, the album was written by Veirs herself and produced by her husband Tucker Martine.
 
Recorded under Raven Marching Band Records in the US, and under Bella Union in Europe, ‘’Warp & Weft’’ is one of Veirs’ greatest commercial successes.  It debuted at number 10 on the US Folk Albums chart and number 59 on the UK Albums Chart.

Background and composition 
On February 2, 2013, Laura Veirs announced on her official Facebook  page that she was working her next full-length record in her husband Tucker Martine's studio, and also specified she would work with "new and old friends". Several hours before, she had announced her pregnancy, saying the child would be born in April.

Teaming up with American singer-songwriter Neko Case for the first time, and with some members of The Decemberists, Veirs recorded the album in a basement studio, as she was still pregnant with her second child. Her pregnancy is a very important theme in the album. Even though she does not directly deal with pregnancy in her songs, Veirs explained: "I'm haunted by the idea that something terrible could happen to my kids, but that fear pushes me to embrace the moment. This record is an exploration of extremes - deep, dark suffering and intense, compassionate love."

Singles 
Two weeks before the album release, "Sun Song", the opening track, was released on August 8, 2013. The song features Neko Case on backing vocals. Directed by Alexandra Spalding, the "Sun Song" video is an Instagram-type tribute to the sun, with a diorama of sunny scenes in the countryside, and some pictures of Veirs playing guitar. The same week, "America" was also announced as a single.

Track listing

Charts

References

2013 albums
Laura Veirs albums
Albums produced by Tucker Martine